Pouya Seif Panahi (born August 13, 1986) is an Iranian footballer who played for Zob Ahan in Iran's Premier Football League.

Club career
In 2009, Seif Panahi joined Pas Hamedan.

Club Career Statistics
Last Update:  20 April 2015 

 Assist Goals

Honours

Club
Zob Ahan
Hazfi Cup (1): 2014–15

References

1986 births
Living people
Pas players
Sanat Mes Kerman F.C. players
Iranian footballers
Shirin Faraz Kermanshah players
Machine Sazi F.C. players
Association football defenders